Julius Heinrich Franz (28 June 1847 – 28 January 1913) was a German astronomer.

Franz was born in Rummelsburg, Prussian Pomerania, he studied at the Universities of Greifswald, Halle and Berlin, after which he was the principal astronomer at the Royal Observatory in Königsberg. In 1882 he was a member of a team sent to the town of Aiken, South Carolina, to observe the transit of Venus. Toward the end of the century he replaced Johann Galle as the director of the observatory at the University of Breslau.

He is most noted for his measurements of features near the lunar limbs. He published a popular book about the Moon in 1906 called Der Mond. In this work Julius named some lunar mares along the limb the Mare Orientale, Mare Autumni and Mare Veris. The later two were later renamed to the Lacus Autumni and Lacus Veris.

Bibliography
 Die Figur des Mondes, 1899, Königsberg.
 Der Mond, 1906, Leipzig.
 Second edition:

Honors
 The crater Franz on the Moon is named after him.

References

1847 births
1913 deaths
People from Miastko
People from the Province of Pomerania
20th-century German astronomers
Academic staff of the Humboldt University of Berlin
Academic staff of the University of Breslau
Academic staff of the University of Königsberg
University of Greifswald alumni
University of Halle alumni
19th-century German astronomers